Bierum is a village in the Dutch province of Groningen. It is a part of the municipality of Eemsdelta, and lies about 27 km northeast of Groningen.

Bierum was a separate municipality until 1990, when it was merged with Delfzijl.

In 2017, the village of Bierum had 673 inhabitants. The built-up area of the village was 0.20 km², and contained 225 residences.
The statistical area Bierum, which also includes the surrounding countryside, has a population of around 1,090 (not including the villages Spijk, Losdorp, Godlinze, Holwierde, and Krewerd).

References

External links
 

Populated places in Groningen (province)
Former municipalities of Groningen (province)
Eemsdelta